Lulu Island is an island located in British Columbia, Canada.

Lulu Island may also refer to:

 Lulu Island (Abu Dhabi), in the United Arab Emirates
 Lulu Island (Alaska), an island of Alaska